Evonne Goolagong Cawley defeated Chris Evert Lloyd in the final, 6–1, 7–6(7–4) to win the ladies' singles tennis title at the 1980 Wimbledon Championships. It was her seventh and last major singles title, and Goolagong Cawley became the first (and still only) mother to win the Wimbledon singles title in the post World War I era. The second-set tiebreak was the first ever played in the ladies singles final at Wimbledon, and the match was the first ever singles final (men's or women's) to end on a tiebreak. Goolagong Cawley was the first and only champion (man or woman) to defeat four top ten ranked players en route to victory.

Martina Navratilova was the two-time defending champion, but lost to Evert Lloyd in the semifinals.

Seeds

  Martina Navratilova (semifinals)
  Tracy Austin (semifinals)
  Chris Evert Lloyd (final)
  Evonne Goolagong Cawley (champion)
  Billie Jean King (quarterfinals)
  Wendy Turnbull (quarterfinals)
  Virginia Wade (fourth round)
  Dianne Fromholtz (fourth round)
  Hana Mandlíková (fourth round)
  Kathy Jordan (fourth round)
  Greer Stevens (quarterfinals)
  Virginia Ruzici (second round)
  Sue Barker (second round)
  Andrea Jaeger (quarterfinals)
  Regina Maršíková (second round)
  Sylvia Hanika (second round)

Qualifying

Draw

Finals

Top half

Section 1

Section 2

Section 3

Section 4

Bottom half

Section 5

Section 6

Section 7

Section 8

See also
 Evert–Navratilova rivalry

References

External links

1980 Wimbledon Championships – Women's draws and results at the International Tennis Federation

Women's Singles
Wimbledon Championship by year – Women's singles
Wimbledon Championships
Wimbledon Championships